Haaziq Kazi (born 8 April 2006) is a middle-school student from Pune, India known for his project (alias ERVIS) to clean ocean from wastes (primarily plastic). Haaziq is one of the youngest presenters at TEDx at multiple occasions. He was widely covered by media for being young innovator and titled a 'child prodigy' by many. ERVIS is the creation of Haaziq which is a large vessel in the ocean with multiple saucers attached to it. ERVIS could help suck wastes out the surface of oceans. He has also interacted with press and media to raise awareness on the plastic problem and how it is affecting marine life.

Background 
Haaziq as a student of Grade VIII (2019), in Indus International School Pune; as part of project had created a prototype of a ship called ERVIS which is an alias assigned to the large ship to clean ocean of waste materials as part of cleaning the nature. He presented at TED ED weekend in New York in June 2017 where he did his first international Talk. Subsequently, he has spoken at TedxGateway in Mumbai on his journey of ERVIS and the peril of plastic pollution.

Project ERVIS 
As Haaziq describes, "the ship is essentially a large boat powered by hydrogen and renewable natural gas with various compartments and saucers surrounding it". The saucers, float on the surface gravitate to create a whirlpool to pull the waste towards its center. These saucers will have a central outlet which will swallow the waste and is connected via a tube to various chambers in the ship. These chambers include an oil chamber which collects waste oil. There are four more chambers which are for large, medium, small & micro waste respectively.

Three core principles go behind concept of ERVIS

● Phase 1: Clean the current waste floating in the ocean.

● Phase 2: Analyze the data from the waste which ERVIS collected to isolate major pollutants and their respective sources.

● Phase 3: Stop waste disposal at source, which is getting disposed by pollutants in oceans.

See also
 Prasiddhi Singh

References

External links 
 Ervis Foundation

2006 births
Living people
People from Pune
Students in India
Indian environmentalists